Dajana Spasojević (born 29 October 1997) is a Bosnian footballer who plays as a forward and has appeared for the Bosnia and Herzegovina women's national team.

Club career
On 8 March 2022, the Turkish Women's Football Super League team was transferred to the Galatasaray club.

International career
Spasojević has been capped for the Bosnia and Herzegovina national team, appearing for the team during the 2019 FIFA Women's World Cup qualifying cycle.

References

External links
 
 
 

1997 births
Living people
WFC Zhytlobud-1 Kharkiv players
Bosnia and Herzegovina women's footballers
Bosnia and Herzegovina women's international footballers
Women's association football forwards
Galatasaray S.K. women's football players